Ingo Hertzsch (born 22 July 1977) is a German former professional footballer who played as a defender.

Club career 
Hertzsch was born in Meerane. He appeared in more than 225 Bundesliga matches.

International career 
Hertzsch played for the Germany national team in a friendly match against Denmark in November 2000 and in a friendly against Bulgaria in August 2002.

References

External links 
 
 
 
 Leverkusen who's who 

1977 births
Living people
People from Meerane
German footballers
Germany international footballers
Germany B international footballers
Germany under-21 international footballers
Association football central defenders
Bundesliga players
2. Bundesliga players
Hamburger SV players
Eintracht Frankfurt players
Bayer 04 Leverkusen players
1. FC Kaiserslautern players
FC Augsburg players
RB Leipzig players
Footballers from Saxony